Alessandria della Rocca (Sicilian: Lisciànnira di la Rocca) is a comune and small agricultural town located  in the northern part of the Province of Agrigento,  west central Sicily, southern Italy.

The town itself was founded in 1570 by Don Carlo Blasco Barresi, and was initially called Pietra d'Amico after the castle. In 1713, it was renamed Alessandria di Sicilia, while the present name Alessandria della Rocca was adopted by Royal Decree on 7 November 1862.

Many of the town's inhabitants emigrated to the United States, particularly Tampa, Florida, in the late 19th and early 20th centuries. One of these emigrants was Giuseppina Saverino, who would later become the grandmother of American football player Joe Montana, migrating in 1921.

References

Municipalities of the Province of Agrigento
Populated places established in 1570
1570 establishments in Italy